The 2007 Atlantic 10 Conference Baseball Championship was held from May 23 through 26 at Fifth Third Field in Dayton, OH. It featured the top six regular-season finishers of the conference's 14 teams. Top-seeded Charlotte defeated Fordham in the title game to win the tournament for the first time, earning the Atlantic 10's automatic bid to the 2007 NCAA Tournament.

Seeding and format 
The league's top six teams, based on winning percentage in the 27-game regular-season schedule, were seeded one through six. The top two seeds, Charlotte and Fordham, received byes into the second round of play in the double elimination tournament.

Bracket

All-Tournament Team 
The following players were named to the All-Tournament Team. Charlotte shortstop Shayne Moody, one of five 49ers selected, was named Most Outstanding Player.

References 

Tournament
Atlantic 10 Conference Baseball Tournament
Atlantic 10 Conference baseball tournament
Atlantic 10 Conference baseball tournament
College baseball tournaments in Ohio
Sports competitions in Dayton, Ohio